Jamie Wednesday were a British 1980s jangle pop band, formed in Streatham, South London in 1984, that released eight songs on two records between 1985 and 1986. Previously they had been called The Ballpoints, and then they became Peter Pan's Playground, later deciding on the name Jamie Wednesday.

The band consisted of: 
James Morrison - acoustic guitar, lead vocals
Leslie "Fruitbat" Carter - bass guitar, backing vocals
Dean Leggett - Drums and percussion
Lindsey Lowe - Trumpet
Simon Henry - Saxophone

Jamie Wednesday recorded and released two EPs, and contributed to two compilations on the Pink Records label, but they never sold well and the band remained virtually unknown. Jamie Wednesday are indirectly responsible for the name of the band Pop Will Eat Itself, when an article about Jamie Wednesday in the NME, written by David Quantick, mentioned that pop music is ever-recycling its ideas and that eventually, "pop will eat itself".

Jamie Wednesday split up in 1987 just before a scheduled appearance at an opening gig. James Morrison and Leslie Carter stuck together and filled in for that gig. Thus Carter USM was born, with Morrison and Carter becoming Jim Bob and Fruitbat respectively. Drummer Leggett subsequently joined BOB.

Discography
Vote for Love (12" EP, 1985, Pink) (UK Indie No. 46)
We Three Kings of Orient Aren't (12" EP, 1986, Pink)

They also contributed two tracks to the Pink Label compilation album, Beauty.

References

English pop music groups
British indie pop groups
Jangle pop groups
Musical groups from the London Borough of Lambeth